Gangshan is a railway station on the Taiwan Railways Administration West Coast line located in Gangshan District, Kaohsiung, Taiwan.

History
In November 1923, a second, wooden station building was opened to replace the original 1900 station. The current station building was opened on 29 October 1993, and the 1923 wooden station building burned down on 3 November 1995. Contactless smartcard fare gates were installed at this station on 30 September 2013.

The Kaohsiung Metro  is expected to be extended northwards to Gangshan Station by 2024.

Around the station
 Gangshan Water Tower
 Kaohsiung Museum of Shadow Puppet
 Provincial Highway 1
 Republic of China Air Force Academy

See also
 List of railway stations in Taiwan

References

1900 establishments in Taiwan
Railway stations in Kaohsiung
Railway stations opened in 1900
Railway stations served by Taiwan Railways Administration